Namon Leo Daughtry (born December 3, 1940) is a former Republican member of the North Carolina General Assembly representing the state's twenty-sixth House district, including constituents in Johnston County, North Carolina. An attorney from Smithfield, North Carolina, Daughtry served in the state House since 1995. He previously served two terms in the state Senate.

Early life and education
Daughtry was born in Newton Grove, North Carolina on December 3, 1940.

He would graduate from Wake Forest University with a Bachelor of Arts degree in 1962 and go on to receive his L.L.B. from the same university's School of Law in 1965.

Military service
 Captain, Judge Advocate General, United States Air Force; 1966–69

Political career
Daughtry served in the North Carolina Senate from 1989 through 1993. He was elected to the state House in 1992, where he was elected Majority Leader in his first term. After Republicans lost control of the House in the 1998 elections, he became Minority Leader. The 2008 election is the only race when he has faced an opponent.
Daughtry was a candidate for Governor of North Carolina in the 2000 election, losing the primary to Richard Vinroot.

He has been a Delegate to the Republican National Conventions of 1976, 1980, 1984, 1988, 1992, and 1996.

Currently, Daughtry serves on the UNC Board of Governors.

Election results

Civic activities
 Board of Directors, Community Foundation

Awards 
 1996–97; Celebrity of the Year Award; Johnston County Schools
 1996; Man of the Year; Boy Scouts of America
 1995; Man of the Year; Johnston County Chamber of Commerce

References

External links

|-

|-

|-

Official site

Republican Party members of the North Carolina House of Representatives
Republican Party North Carolina state senators
Wake Forest University alumni
Living people
1940 births
21st-century American politicians
People from Sampson County, North Carolina
Military personnel from North Carolina
North Carolina lawyers